Dirusumarru is a village in Andhra Pradesh, India. It is located in West Godavari district and is a few miles away from Bhimavaram. Along with Vempa, a neighbouring village, it is known for aquaculture. The nearest railway station is Bhimavaram JN (BVRM) located at a distance of 7 km.

Demographics 

 Census of India, Dirusumarru had a population of 8645. The total population constitute, 4358 males and 4287 females with a sex ratio of 984 females per 1000 males. 852 children are in the age group of 0–6 years, with sex ratio of 1063. The average literacy rate stands at 71.45%.

References

Villages in West Godavari district